USS Portsmouth may refer to the following ships of the United States Navy:

, was a 24-gun ship in service from 1798 to 1801
, was a sloop-of-war commissioned in 1844, active in the Mexican–American War 1846–1848, decommissioned in 1878 but continuing as a training ship until 1915
, was a  light cruiser in service from 1945 to 1949
, a  nuclear attack submarine commissioned in 1983 and decommissioned in 2004

United States Navy ship names